La Putain respectueuse (The Respectful Prostitute) is a French drama film from 1952, directed by Marcello Pagliero and Charles Brabant, written by Alexandre Astruc, starring Barbara Laage and Louis de Funès. It is an adaptation of Jean-Paul Sartre's 1946 play The Respectful Prostitute.

Cast

References

External links 
 
 L’Amour n’est pas un péché (1952) at the Films de France

1952 films
French drama films
1950s French-language films
French black-and-white films
Films set in the United States
French films based on plays
Films directed by Marcello Pagliero
1952 drama films
1950s French films